Cathal Ó Matadain, Irish philosopher, died 1343. 

Ó Matadain is described in the Annals of Lough Ce as a sage of Ireland. In 1343, in unknown circumstances, he was killed by the Clann Ricairt, or the Burke family of Clanricarde in what is now County Galway.

External links
 http://www.ucc.ie/celt/published/T100010A/index.html

Medieval Gaels from Ireland
Irish philosophers
Irish murder victims
People from County Galway
14th-century Irish people
1343 deaths
Year of birth unknown
14th-century philosophers